Rajeev Ram was the defending champion, but lost in the second round to Daniel Nguyen.

Austin Krajicek won the title, defeating Adrián Menéndez-Maceiras 6–7(3–7), 7–6(7–5), 6–4 in the final.

Seeds

Draw

Finals

Top half

Bottom half

References
 Main Draw
 Qualifying Draw

Torneo Internacional Challenger Leon - Singles
2015 Singles